Si Jagur or Ki Jagur is an old cannon of Portuguese heritage which is located in the Jakarta Fatahillah Museum.

History 

Si Jagur cannon was made by a Portuguese named Manoel Tavares Baccaro in Macau, China, which was then brought by the Portuguese to Melaka, In Macau, this cannon was placed by the Portuguese in the fortress of St. Jago de Barra (St. Jago = the name of a saint, de Barra = near the beach, therefore it was called "Si Jagur").

Si Jagur was transferred from Macau to Malacca at some time in the 16th century. It was brought to Batavia by the Dutch after capturing Malacca in 1641. At first the VOC cannon was placed in Batavia Fortress, to guard the port. Then it was moved to an artillery magazine near Tongkol street.

It is also said that Si Jagur has a "twin", the Ki Amuk cannon belonging to the Sultanate of Banten, which is currently in the courtyard of the Banten Grand Mosque. Si Jagur has a length of 3.85 m and a caliber of 25 cm. The weight of the cannon is 3.5 tons.
According to Voyage Autour du Monde by Ludovic Marquis de Beauvoir, the cannon was brought to its position (about 2 miles from Batavia's shore) by some extraordinary tide. Malay women come and settle accounts with the tutelary deity of this gun, and pray for children. The Malays surrounded it and offering incense as well as baskets full of flowers, and the heads of fighting cocks are cut off before it.

See also 

 Ki Amuk
 Bujang Timpang Berang
 Dardanelles gun

References

External links 

 Women-impregnating cannon

http://metro.sindonews.com

 Si Jagur cannon in Jakarta government website

http://jakarta.go.id

 Jakarta History Museum information

https://belajar.kemdikbud.go.id/PetaBudaya/Repositorys/museum_sejarah_jakarta/

Coastal artillery
Weapons of Indonesia
Weapons of Java
Individual cannons